Shanele Marie Stires (born ) is an American retired professional women's basketball player.  She is the head coach of the Cal Poly women's basketball team.

Stires attended Cloud County Community College during her freshman year before transferring to Kansas State University, where she graduated in 1995 with a B.S. degree in Social Science.

She started her American professional career playing for the Columbus Quest in the now-defunct American Basketball League (ABL).  After the ABL ceased operations, she joined the Women's National Basketball Association and played for the Minnesota Lynx for three seasons. 

After her playing career she served three years as an assistant coach for the women's basketball team at Ohio University.  In August 2006, she was named as an assistant coach at University of San Francisco.

Stires is also currently pursuing a Master's Degree in Coaching Education from Ohio University.

Her brother, Sean Stires, is a play-by-play radio announcer for the University of Notre Dame's  women's basketball team.

WNBA career statistics

Regular season

|-
| align="left" | 2000
| align="left" | Minnesota
| 21 || 0 || 5.6 || .448 || .500 || .667 || 0.7 || 0.3 || 0.3 || 0.0 || 0.7 || 1.7
|-
| align="left" | 2001
| align="left" | Minnesota
| 18 || 5 || 11.2 || .377 || .240 || .714 || 1.5 || 0.8 || 0.4 || 0.2 || 1.1 || 2.8
|-
| align="left" | 2002
| align="left" | Minnesota
| 9 || 0 || 2.4 || .500 || .500 || .500 || 0.7 || 0.1 || 0.0 || 0.1 || 0.2 || 0.7
|-
| align="left" | Career
| align="left" | 3 years, 1 team
| 48 || 5 || 7.1 || .407 || .324 || .667 || 1.0 || 0.5 || 0.3 || 0.1 || 0.7 || 1.9

External links
WNBA Player Profile
August 10, 2006 article on her joining the University of San Francisco's coaching staff

1972 births
Living people
American women's basketball coaches
American women's basketball players
Basketball coaches from Kansas
Basketball players from Kansas
Columbus Quest players
Kansas State Wildcats women's basketball players
Minnesota Lynx draft picks
Minnesota Lynx players
Ohio University alumni
People from Cloud County, Kansas
Small forwards